Chroniques blanches (English: White Chronicles) is a 2009 Moroccan film directed by Abdelkrim Derkaoui. It was screened at the National Film Festival.

Cast 

 Mourad Zaoui
 Karim Saidi
 Laila Hadioui
 Hatim Idar
 Ahmed Jaidi
 Mustapha Zaari
 Mohammed Nouaimane
 Nabila Kilani
 Ahmed Reddani
 Hamid Najah

References 

2009 films